Trinity English Lutheran Church (now known as the Mount Olive Lutheran Church) is a historic Lutheran church at 3100 Martin Luther King, Jr., Boulevard in Dallas, Texas. The congregation is currently part of the Evangelical Lutheran Church in America.

The late Gothic Revival church building was constructed in 1922 and added to the National Register of Historic Places in 1995.

See also

National Register of Historic Places listings in Dallas County, Texas

References

Churches in Dallas
Lutheran churches in Texas
Churches on the National Register of Historic Places in Texas
National Register of Historic Places in Dallas
Gothic Revival church buildings in Texas
Churches completed in 1922
20th-century Lutheran churches in the United States